Blueprint for a Massacre (or Agente Z 55: Secreto atómico), also known as Agent Z-55: Atomic Secret, is a 1967 Italian-Spanish Eurospy film co-written and directed by Roberto Bianchi Montero and starring Germán Cobos.

Production    
The film was shot back to back with Desperate Mission, of which it is the sequel. During the shooting, Nick Nostro replaced Montero for two weeks.

Plot

Cast  
 
   Germán Cobos	as Danny O'Connor / Agent Z-55
 María Mahor	as Aya
 Franco Ressel 
 Gabriella Andreini  
 Maria Pia Conte 
 Remo De Angelis 
 Irving B. Mayer
 Carlo Gervasi
 Sal Borgese
 Pietro Ceccarelli

References

External links

1967 films
1960s spy thriller films
Spanish spy thriller films
Italian spy thriller films
Films directed by Roberto Bianchi Montero
Films scored by Piero Umiliani
Spanish sequel films
Italian sequel films
Films with screenplays by Roberto Bianchi Montero
1960s Italian films
1960s Spanish films